Let's Get Married is a 1926 American silent comedy film produced by Famous Players-Lasky and distributed by Paramount Pictures. It was directed by Gregory La Cava and stars Richard Dix and Lois Wilson. The film is based on an 1897 play The Man from Mexico by Henry A. Du Souchet performed by William Collier, Sr. This film is a remake of a 1914 film, The Man from Mexico starring John Barrymore which is now considered a lost film.

Cast

Preservation
A print of Let's Get Married is preserved at the Library of Congress.

References

External links

Still at silenthollywood.com

1926 films
American silent feature films
American films based on plays
Films directed by Gregory La Cava
Famous Players-Lasky films
1926 comedy films
Silent American comedy films
American black-and-white films
Surviving American silent films
1920s American films